Faberia is a genus of Chinese flowering plants in the family Asteraceae.

The genus is named for Ernst Faber, a German missionary who collected many plant specimens in China.

 Species

References

Asteraceae genera
Endemic flora of China
Cichorieae